Gadao's Cave, also known as Liyang Gadao, is a rock art site on the United States island of Guam.  Located near the village of Inarajan, the cave is the site of a panel of approximately 50 Chamorro pictographs, painted with a mixture of coral lime and tree sap.  The most unusual images are of two human stick figures that appear to be carrying things.  It is not known who painted them or when, and what their significance is. The legendary chief of Inarajan Gadao is believed to be the creator of the cave's images.

The cave was listed on the National Register of Historic Places in 1974.

Space 
The entrance to the cave is about 10-12 ft wide and about 10 ft high. The following chamber is about 8 ft deep, 5 ft wide, and 7 ft high and its highest point. A small slit between the walls at the chamber's ends opens into a small cavity about 3 ft deep, 2 ft wide, and 7 ft high.

The outer chamber has the majority of images which sizes range from about 3 in to 1 ft.

Documentation 
In 1901, Georg Fritz, the administrator of the German colonial district of the Mariana Islands, documented some of the pictograms. In 1904, he published them in Die Chamorro. It was the first publication on rock art in Micronesia.

See also
National Register of Historic Places listings in Guam

References

Archaeological sites on the National Register of Historic Places in Guam
Rock art of Oceania

Cave paintings